Eugène Dieudonné (1884–1944) was a French anarchist and illegalist. He was a frequent visitor of the headquarters of L'Anarchie and accused of being a member of the Bonnot Gang. Despite Jules Bonnot and Octave Garnier exonerating him, he was accused and convicted of participating in the robbery of a Société Générale branch in Paris in 1912. Initially sentenced to death, his sentence was commuted to forced labor for life and he was sent to French Guiana from where he was able to flee to Brazil in 1926. Journalists Albert Londres and  secured his pardon and he returned to France where he spent the rest of his life as a furniture manufacturer.

References

French anarchists
1884 births
1944 deaths
People from Nancy, France